Andrea Bölk (born 10 November 1968) is a German handball player. She participated at the 1992 Summer Olympics, where the German national team placed fourth.

References 
 Profile at sports-reference.com

1968 births
Living people
Sportspeople from Rostock
People from Bezirk Rostock
German female handball players
Olympic handball players of Germany
Handball players at the 1992 Summer Olympics
Handball players at the 1996 Summer Olympics
20th-century German women